Castellnou de Seana is a village in the province of Lleida and autonomous community of Catalonia, Spain.

Notable people
 Ramón Moya (born 2 March 1956) is a Spanish retired footballer who played as a defender, and a current coach.

References

External links
 Government data pages 

Municipalities in Pla d'Urgell
Populated places in Pla d'Urgell